The 2016 Toronto Blue Jays season was the 40th season of the franchise in the American League East division of Major League Baseball, and the 27th full season of play (28th overall) at Rogers Centre.  They advanced to the playoffs where they defeated the Baltimore Orioles in the Wild Card Game and the Texas Rangers in the Division Series, before losing to the Cleveland Indians in five games in the American League Championship Series.

Off–season
General manager Alex Anthopoulos rejected a five-year contract extension on October 29, 2015, and team president Paul Beeston retired on October 31. New Blue Jays president and CEO Mark Shapiro, who assumed the roles on November 2, 2015, announced that Tony LaCava was assigned as the interim general manager and that John Gibbons would remain as the manager. On November 6, 2015, a $15.8 million qualifying offer was extended to Marco Estrada. David Price was not eligible for a qualifying offer, as he was acquired mid-season. Estrada signed a two-year, $26 million contract on November 13.

On November 20, the Blue Jays signed Humberto Quintero to a minor league contract, and acquired Jesse Chavez from the Oakland Athletics for Liam Hendriks. 3 days later, the team signed Casey Kotchman, Jiovanni Mier, and David Adams to minor league contracts that included invitations to spring training. On November 24, Scott Diamond was signed to a minor league contract and invited to spring training. J. A. Happ, who was traded by the Blue Jays to the Seattle Mariners for Michael Saunders before the 2015 season, was signed to a three-year, $36 million contract on November 27. David Price agreed to a seven-year, $217 million contract with the Boston Red Sox on December 1. Justin Smoak, who was eligible for salary arbitration, was signed to a one-year, $3.9 million contract on December 2. Third baseman Josh Donaldson, outfielders Ben Revere and Michael Saunders, and pitchers Jesse Chavez, Drew Hutchison, Steve Delabar, Brett Cecil, and Aaron Loup were also tendered contracts. Catcher Josh Thole was not tendered a contract by the December 2 deadline, and became a free agent. On December 3, Ross Atkins was named the new general manager replacing LaCava. Thole signed a one-year, $800,000 contract with the Blue Jays on December 4.

Mark Lowe signed a two-year contract with the Detroit Tigers on December 8, for $11 million. In the Rule 5 draft on December 10, the Blue Jays selected pitcher Joe Biagini from the San Francisco Giants organization. Darwin Barney officially re-signed with the team on December 11. Wade LeBlanc was signed to a minor league contract on December 17. On December 18, Junior Lake was claimed off waivers, and signed Scott Copeland, Roberto Hernández, Pat McCoy, and Brad Penny to minor league contracts with invitations to spring training. Brandon Bixler and Gabe Noyalis were signed to minor-league contracts on December 29. On January 5, 2016, Arnold León was acquired from the Oakland Athletics for cash or a player to be named later. Three days later, outfielder Ben Revere and a player to be named later were traded to the Washington Nationals for reliever Drew Storen.

On January 12, pitchers Brett Cecil, Jesse Chavez, Steve Delabar, Drew Hutchison, Aaron Loup, and Drew Storen filed for salary arbitration, along with position players Josh Donaldson and Michael Saunders. Cecil, Delabar, Loup, Hutchison, and Storen agreed to a one-year contracts worth $3.8 million, $835,000, $1.05 million, $2.2 million, and $8.375 million respectively on January 15. Saunders agreed to a $2.9 million contract. Chavez and Donaldson did not come to an agreement before the deadline. Chavez had requested $4 million, while the Blue Jays offered $3.6 million. Donaldson filed for $11.8 million, and the Blue Jays offered $11.35 million. On January 18, Daniel Schlereth was signed to a minor league contract. Maicer Izturis, who was under contract with the Blue Jays for the 2015 season but did not play for the team due to various injuries, was signed to a minor league contract on January 29. On February 2, outfielder Darrell Ceciliani was acquired from the New York Mets for a player to be named later. David Aardsma was added to the list of non-roster invitees on February 5.

On February 6, it was announced that Chavez had won his arbitration case, and will receive a $4 million salary for the season. In addition, Gavin Floyd signed a one-year, $1 million contract with the Blue Jays, and Chad Jenkins was designated for assignment. On February 10, Donaldson avoided arbitration by signing a two-year, $28.65 million extension that will pay him $11.65 million in 2016, and $17 million in 2017. Colt Hynes, who spent most of the 2015 season with the Buffalo Bisons, was signed to a minor league contract on February 12. Three days before pitchers and catchers were scheduled to report to Dunedin, catcher Tony Sanchez was signed to a minor league contract with an invitation to spring training. Outfielder Domonic Brown and reliever Rafael Soriano were also added to the organization, each receiving a minor league contract and an invitation to spring training in late February.

At Rogers Centre, a full dirt infield was installed prior to the home opener; for the previous six seasons (2010–15), it was the only MLB ballpark with

Trades

Free agency

In

Out

Waivers

In

Spring training

Shortly after pitchers and catchers reported to Dunedin for the start of spring training on February 22, José Bautista addressed the media regarding his contract situation. Bautista, in the final year of a five-year, $65 million contract, stated that he had told the Blue Jays the length of contract he was seeking as well as the compensation of said contract, and that he would not negotiate or agree to a "hometown discount". The following day, TSN's Rick Westhead reported that Bautista had requested a five-year, $150 million contract. The report was later refuted by Bautista. While Bautista's contract situation was unfolding, the Blue Jays, Los Angeles Angels of Anaheim, and Cincinnati Reds were reported to be in agreement on a trade that would have sent Michael Saunders to the Angels, Jay Bruce to the Blue Jays, and unnamed prospects from the Angels and Blue Jays to the Reds. Hours after the trade was made public, reports surfaced that the deal was on hold due to issues with an unknown player's physical.

On March 4, Maicer Izturis unexpectedly announced his retirement, stating "I put my heart, my soul and my body into it this year to see how I was going to feel, but my body couldn't handle it anymore. So I decided this is the last time I'm going to be playing baseball." He had appeared in one game for the Blue Jays to that point, going hitless in two at-bats. On March 18, Brad Penny, who had joined the Blue Jays on a minor league contract, announced his retirement. Two days later, Rafael Soriano announced his retirement as well. Soriano signed a minor league contract with the Blue Jays in late February, but did not appear in any spring training games due to unspecified visa issues.

On March 23, Marcus Stroman was named the Opening Day starter for the Blue Jays. The competition for fifth starter ended on March 28, when John Gibbons announced that Aaron Sanchez had earned the final rotation spot. Steve Delabar, who had been an All-Star for the Blue Jays in 2013, was released on March 29, along with Randy Choate. The final roles left to be determined were the fourth outfielder, closer, and remainder of the bullpen pitchers. On March 30, John Gibbons announced that Ezequiel Carrera would be the fourth outfielder, Roberto Osuna would begin the season in the closer's role, and Arnold León, Joe Biagini, and Ryan Tepera would round out the bullpen positions. Gibbons also announced that Marco Estrada and Aaron Loup would open the season on the disabled list. To close spring training, the Blue Jays returned to Montreal's Olympic Stadium for a two-game series against the Red Sox.

Standings

American League East

American League Wild Card

Records vs opponents

2016 draft
The 2016 Major League Baseball draft was held on June 9–11.

 – Toronto received the 57th overall selection for failing to sign pitcher Brady Singer, who was selected 56th overall in the 2015 draft.

Regular season

Opening Day

April

The Blue Jays opened the 2016 season in Tampa Bay for a four-game series against the Rays. Marcus Stroman pitched into the ninth on Opening Day, and held the Rays to three runs in a 5–3 victory, closed out by Roberto Osuna. Osuna would earn the save in the second game of the series as well, finishing another 5–3 win over Tampa Bay. Jesse Chavez and Drew Storen made their debuts for the Blue Jays, each pitching one inning in the win. Brett Cecil also pitched a scoreless inning in the game, his 38th consecutive game played without allowing an earned run, which tied the MLB record set by Craig Kimbrel in 2011. Cecil's streak would end the following night, as he yielded a two-run home run to Logan Forsythe to give the Rays a 3–2 lead that they would not relinquish. In the ninth inning, the Blue Jays loaded the bases with one out for Edwin Encarnación, who hit a ground ball to Evan Longoria, who threw to Forsythe at second to begin a double play. José Bautista slid into second and Forsythe threw wide of first, allowing two runs to score and giving the Blue Jays a 4–3 lead, however Rays manager Kevin Cash challenged that Bautista had violated the league's new "Chase Utley Rule" with his slide, by attempting to break-up the double play. After a short review, the umpires reversed their decision, and called both Bautista and Encarnación out, ending the game. Tampa Bay would split the series in the finale, defeating the Blue Jays 5–3. Reigning American League MVP Josh Donaldson left mid-game after injuring his right calf.

After an off-day, the Blue Jays began a three-game series against the Boston Red Sox, with Marcus Stroman taking the mound in the home opener. The Blue Jays led the game 7–2 following Josh Donaldson's second-career grand slam in the fourth inning, but in the sixth, Brock Holt hit a grand slam for the Red Sox, and the Blue Jays bullpen would blow their third lead in as many games to take the loss, 8–7. In the second game, R. A. Dickey would yield seven runs in an 8–4 loss, while José Bautista hit two home runs to record his 29th career multi-home run game. Marco Estrada, who began the season on the disabled list with a back injury, made the start in the final game of the series looking to avoid a sweep. Estrada would pitch seven shutout innings in his season debut, earning the win over the Red Sox, 3–0. The Blue Jays then battled the New York Yankees for the first time in 2016. The first game of the series went to the Yankees, who took advantage of Brett Cecil's early season struggles to win 3–2. J. A. Happ would earn the win the following night, 7–2, holding the opposition to fewer than two runs for the 11th time in his last 12 games. José Bautista also recorded his 800th career RBI in the game. Toronto would also take the rubber match, 4–2, led by 8 strong innings and 17 groundball outs from Marcus Stroman.

After travelling to Boston, the Blue Jays took on the Red Sox at Fenway Park. Edwin Encarnación hit his first two home runs of the season but the Red Sox would prevail, taking the opener 5–3. David Price made the start in the second game of the series, his first start against the Blue Jays since signing with Boston in the offseason. He would hold the Jays to two runs over seven innings and earn the win, 4–2. Aaron Sanchez recorded his third consecutive quality start of the season by holding the Sox to two hits and one run over seven innings in the third game of the series, and took a no-hitter into the fifth inning. The Blue Jays would win the game, 5–3. The final game of the series, played on Patriots' Day, saw the Blue Jays hang on to win, 4–3. Drew Storen recorded his first save with Toronto, as Roberto Osuna was unavailable for the game. Nearing the end of 17 consecutive games against AL East opponents to open the season, the Blue Jays travelled to Baltimore to play the first-place Orioles. The first game of the series saw Marcus Stroman earn his third win of the season, as Toronto gave the Orioles their first loss at home in 2016. The second game of the series went into extra innings tied 3–3. Rookie Joe Biagini loaded the bases in the tenth inning, and allowed the Orioles to score the winning run on a wild pitch. In the rubber match, the Orioles would beat the Blue Jays 3–2, after Toronto was unable to score after plating two runs in the first inning.

Returning home with an 8–9 record, the Blue Jays would battle the Oakland Athletics, who entered the series undefeated on the road in 2016. Hours prior to the game, MLB announced that Chris Colabello had been suspended for 80 games, after testing positive for performance-enhancing drugs in March. Aaron Sanchez struggled through the worst start of his young career, allowing six earned runs in 4 innings pitched, as the Blue Jays lost 8–5. The Blue Jays offence, which lead all of MLB in 2015, appeared to get back on track in the second game, as Troy Tulowitzki recorded his 12th career multi-home run game and Josh Donaldson also homered and drove in four runs in a 9–3 victory. In the final game of the series, Drew Hutchison was recalled from Triple-A Buffalo to make a spot start for the Jays. He held the Athletics to 2 runs over 5 innings as the Blue Jays won the series, 6–3. Toronto then battled the first-place Chicago White Sox in a three-game series. The Jays held a four run lead in the first game, only to have their bullpen yield the lead in the seventh inning, and take a 7–5 loss. In the second game, White Sox ace Chris Sale earned his league-leading fifth win of the season, beating the Blue Jays 10–1. Chicago would complete the sweep of the Blue Jays with a 4–0 win in the third game of the series.

After a day off, the Blue Jays closed out April in Tampa Bay, where their season began. Michael Saunders recorded his first two home run game as a Blue Jay, and Aaron Sanchez rebounded from his previous start, throwing seven shutout innings to lead the Blue Jays to a 6–1 victory. Brett Cecil took his fifth loss of the season in the final game of April, 4–3, by allowing the winning run to score in the bottom of the ninth inning without recording an out. In taking the loss, Cecil became the first relief pitcher since at least the 1913 season to earn five losses in April.

May

In the rubber match against Tampa, Marcus Stroman earned his team-leading fourth win of the season, defeating the Rays 5–1. The Blue Jays were held to just 15 hits in the three-game series, but hit 8 home runs. The Blue Jays then returned to Toronto to face the Texas Rangers for the first time since defeating them in the 2015 American League Division Series. The Rangers would win the first game of the series, 2–1, and give the Jays their fourth loss in a row at home. In the second game of the series, Justin Smoak hit his first home run of the season to tie the game in the ninth inning, and in the tenth, hit a walk-off two-run home run to give the Blue Jays a 3–1 victory. Russell Martin gave the Blue Jays their second-consecutive walk-off win the following night, 4–3, after knocking in the winning run with a single to right field in the ninth inning. Toronto would take the series finale, tagging Rangers starter Derek Holland for 11 earned runs in a 12–2 win. The Blue Jays scored double-digit runs for the first time in 2016, and Edwin Encarnación hit his 202nd home run with the Blue Jays, tying George Bell for fifth all-time. The Jays then battled the Los Angeles Dodgers at home for three games. The first game was taken by the Blue Jays, 5–2, aided by Kevin Pillar's tie-breaking three-run home run in the eighth inning. In the second game, the Blue Jays were held in check by Clayton Kershaw, who earned the win over Toronto, 6–2. The Blue Jays fell in the rubber match, 4–2, with Drew Storen taking the loss after another poor performance in relief of Marco Estrada's seven strong innings.

Continuing their interleague play, the Blue Jays travelled to San Francisco to battle the Giants in a three-game series. In the first of two favourable pitching matches, the Blue Jays sent Aaron Sanchez to the mound to face Jake Peavy, who entered with a 9.00 earned run average. Toronto would take the first game of the series, 3–1. J. A. Happ started the second game for the Blue Jays, taking on Matt Cain, who owned an ERA over 7 at the start of play. Happ earned his team-leading fifth win, lowered his ERA to 2.08, and came within one out of a complete game shutout as the Blue Jays won by a score of 4–0. The Blue Jays were denied their first sweep of the 2016 season, losing the finale 5–4 in the 13th inning. The team ended their six-game road trip in Arlington, Texas, to take on the Rangers. The Blue Jays won the first game of the series, shutting out the Rangers 5–0 in R. A. Dickey's best start of the season to that point. In the second game, Justin Smoak and Troy Tulowitzki hit back-to-back home runs to tie the game 5–5 in the ninth inning. However, Drew Stubbs would hit a walk-off home run in the tenth to even the series.
Blue Jays–Rangers brawl
The final game of the series, a 7–6 loss for the Blue Jays, was filled with controversy. In the eighth inning, José Bautista, who had given the Blue Jays a 5–2 lead earlier in the game with a bases-clearing double, was hit by a pitch from Rangers reliever Matt Bush. The move was largely considered as retaliation for Bautista flipping his bat after hitting a go-ahead three-run home run in the 2015 American League Division Series, and resulted in both benches being warned by the home plate umpire, Dan Iassogna. Justin Smoak later grounded into a would-be double play, however Bautista slid hard into second base, taking out Rougned Odor and preventing the double play from being completed. Odor took exception to Bautista's slide, and retaliated by punching Bautista in the face, which resulted in a bench-clearing brawl. Bautista was called for an illegal slide, which ended the inning. Bautista, Odor, and Josh Donaldson were ejected in the brawl. Donaldson got ejected for attempting to tackle Odor in the brawl after Odor punched Bautista. In the bottom half of the inning, Jesse Chavez hit Prince Fielder with his first pitch, which resulted in the ejections of Chavez, Blue Jays bench coach DeMarlo Hale, and Rangers bench coach Steve Buechele. Blue Jays manager John Gibbons and first base coach Tim Leiper were also ejected earlier in the game. Leiper was ejected for arguing with first base umpire Dale Scott, and Gibbons was ejected by Iassogna for arguing balls and strikes.

Following their brawl with the Rangers, the Blue Jays went home for a short, three-game home stand against Tampa Bay. The Rays took the first game of the series, 13–2, giving J. A. Happ his first loss of the season. Prior to the second game, punishments for the Blue Jays and Rangers were handed down by Joe Torre, MLB's chief baseball officer. John Gibbons and Jesse Chavez were each suspended three games (Gibbons for coming back onto the field after being ejected), while José Bautista and Tim Leiper were suspended for one game. Both Bautista and Chavez appealed their suspensions. Gibbons was also fined $5,000, and Josh Donaldson and Kevin Pillar were fined an undisclosed amount. For the Rangers, Rougned Odor was fined and suspended for eight games (reduced to 7 games on appeal), and Elvis Andrus was suspended one game. Matt Bush, Sam Dyson, A. J. Griffin, and Robinson Chirinos were each fined an undisclosed amount. The Rays would again win by blow-out, defeating the Blue Jays 12–2 that night. Tampa Bay would complete the sweep with a 6–3 win in the finale, giving the Blue Jays their first five-game losing streak of the 2016 season.

Looking to end the streak, the Blue Jays took on the last-place Minnesota Twins in Minneapolis. The first game would go into extra innings before Troy Tulowitzki drove in the go-ahead run in the eleventh. Joe Biagini would earn his first career save in the game, closing out the 3–2 win. An offensive outburst would power the Jays to victory in the second game of the series, 9–3, lead by home runs from José Bautista, Josh Donaldson, Michael Saunders, and Darwin Barney. J. A. Happ would pitch seven scoreless innings against the Twins the following day, however Minnesota would score five runs in the eighth inning to take a 5–3 lead that they would not relinquish. The Blue Jays ended the four-game series on a high note, winning the finale 3–1 thanks to another strong pitching performance from staff ace Marcus Stroman. The Jays ended their road trip playing the Yankees for three games. In 2015, Toronto played to an 8–2 record in New York. Their first game did not go as planned, as the Yankees handed the Jays their second shutout of the season, 6–0. Russell Martin hit his first two home runs of the 2016 season in the second game, leading the Blue Jays to an 8–4 victory, their first of the season when allowing 4 or more runs. The game also saw the return of Devon Travis, who went 1–4 at the plate and scored a run. In their final road game of May, the Blue Jays held New York to a single run, taking the series with a 3–1 win.

Returning home after a 5–2 road trip, the Blue Jays clashed with the first-place Red Sox for three games. Prior to the start of the first game, Major League Baseball announced that José Bautista's suspension had been upheld, and he was subsequently removed from the starting line-up. Josh Donaldson led the Jays to a 7–5 victory that night, hitting 2 home runs and knocking in 5 runs. With the Red Sox leading 8–4 in the second game, the Jays battled back to tie the game in the bottom of the eighth inning. In the top of the ninth, David Ortiz hit his 40th career home run at the Rogers Centre, giving Boston a 9–8 lead. With Craig Kimbrel on to preserve the lead, Justin Smoak hit a two-out single to put the tying run on base. After pinch runner Ezequiel Carrera advanced to third base on an error, Russell Martin drilled an RBI double to tie the game. Martin advanced to third base on a passed ball, before Devon Travis hit a walk-off single to complete the comeback, 10–9. David Price got the start in the final game of the series, making his first appearance in Toronto since signing a seven-year, $217 million contract with the Red Sox. Boston would take the game, 5–3, after scoring two runs in the eleventh inning to take the lead. The Jays closed out May with a home series against the Yankees. Marco Estrada pitched eight scoreless innings in the first game, leading Toronto to a 4–2 win. The second game of the series went into the seventh inning tied 1–1, before hits from Kevin Pillar and Darwin Barney drove in three runs to seal a 4–1 win for the Jays.

June
The Blue Jays would complete their first sweep of the season with a 7–0 victory over the Yankees on June 1, with the Jays scoring five runs off Kirby Yates and Nick Goody in the seventh inning. After a day off, Toronto began a six-game road trip with three games against the Red Sox. R. A. Dickey took a no-hitter into the sixth inning in the first game of the series, and the Blue Jays offence got the better of David Price in a 5–2 victory. The Blue Jays also ended a 26-game hitting streak by Xander Bogaerts in the game. In the second game, Marcus Stroman was hit hard by the Red Sox offence. He allowed six earned runs for the third time in his last four games and took the loss, 6–4. In the rubber match, Marco Estrada took a no-hitter into the eighth inning before yielding a solo home run to Chris Young. Roberto Osuna would close out the 5–4 win with a rocky ninth inning, in which he surrendered two runs on four hits. The series victory gave the Blue Jays a 9–3 record over their run of 12 straight games against Boston and New York. The Blue Jays concluded their road trip with three games in Detroit. The Tigers' rookie pitcher Michael Fulmer held Toronto off the board in the first game, winning 11–0. Aaron Sanchez pitched a gem in the second game of the series, shutting out the Tigers over eight innings. In the ninth frame, Sanchez allowed two hits and one run, before turning the game over to the bullpen, who were unable to hold the lead. The Tigers would win the game in the tenth inning, 3–2. Toronto avoided the sweep with a 7–2 victory, led by Josh Donaldson, who finished a double shy of the cycle.

Returning home, the Blue Jays squared-off against the first-place Orioles. Baltimore would come out on top of the first game, 6–5, taking advantage of a struggling Marcus Stroman. Game two went into extra innings, tied 3–3, before Edwin Encarnación hit a walk-off solo home run in the tenth inning. Encarnación drove in five runs the following day, leading the Jays to an 11–6 victory. In the fourth and final game of the series, the Blue Jays beat up on Ubaldo Jiménez, knocking him out of the game in the first inning after scoring five runs. Baltimore would claw back to within a run in the ninth inning, before Jason Grilli was able to end the game, 10–9, and earn his first save with Toronto. Following the series with Baltimore, the Philadelphia Phillies would come to Toronto for a home-and-home series against the Jays. The potent Toronto offence was stymied by Phillies starter Jerad Eickhoff, losing the first game 7–0. They would get back on track in the second game, knocking around Zach Eflin in his Major League debut. Josh Donaldson would hit a grand slam, and Ezequiel Carrera, Kevin Pillar, and Edwin Encarnación also hit home runs in an 11–3 trouncing. After travelling to Philadelphia for the second half of the series, Marco Estrada lead the Jays to a 7–2 win with his tenth consecutive start allowing five or fewer hits, which extended his franchise record. The Blue Jays offence would again prove to be too much for Phillies pitching to handle, as a five home run game led Toronto to a 13–2 win in the series finale. The win came at a price, as José Bautista left the game with a left foot injury. The following day, he was placed on the 15-day disabled list. In the first game of the Blue Jays road series against Baltimore, Michael Saunders became the fourth Canadian player in MLB history to hit three home runs in a game, and led the Toronto offence to their fifth game with double-digit runs scored in their last seven games played. Baltimore would end the Jays four-game winning streak the following day, winning 4–2. The Orioles would take the series with an 11–6 win in the final game of the series, driving Marcus Stroman's ERA to a career-high 5.23.

The Blue Jays opened a brief two-game homestand against the Arizona Diamondbacks after an off-day. Marco Estrada and the Toronto bullpen held the Diamondbacks to just three hits in the first game, but Arizona would win 4–2. The Jays would split the series, taking the final game 5–2 thanks to home runs from Russell Martin, Troy Tulowitzki, and Edwin Encarnación. Toronto would fall to 0–4 against the Chicago White Sox in 2016, losing the first game of their six-game road trip by a score of 3–2. In the second game, the Toronto pitching staff would yield seven home runs to the White Sox, however the Blue Jays would hold on to win 10–8. The White Sox would take the series with a 5–2 win in the third and final game, with ace Chris Sale earning his league-leading thirteenth win. The Blue Jays would then travel to Colorado to take on the Rockies. In 15 games between Toronto and Colorado, the road team had never defeated the home team. The Rockies would keep that streak alive in the first game, defeating the Jays 9–5 after scoring six runs in the seventh inning. Toronto would end the streak in the second game of the series, 14–9, with J. A. Happ earning his tenth win of the season in a game that was delayed for almost three hours due to a hail storm. The Blue Jays would take the series with a 5–3 win in the finale, led by another strong pitching performance by Aaron Sanchez. To close June, the Blue Jays returned home to take on the red-hot Cleveland Indians, who entered the series on a 12-game winning streak. They would continue to roll in the first game of the four-game series, winning 4–1.

July
The second game against Cleveland on Canada Day turned into a marathon match, stretching into the nineteenth inning tied 1–1. While the Indians used Trevor Bauer, who had been scheduled to start the third game of the series, the Blue Jays eventually turned to position players Ryan Goins and Darwin Barney to pitch late in the game. Barney would yield the go-ahead run in the top of the nineteenth, leading to a 2–1 win for Cleveland. The game was not without controversy, as Edwin Encarnación, John Gibbons, and Russell Martin were all ejected by home-plate umpire Vic Carapazza for arguing about the strike zone. Toronto would end Cleveland's 14-game winning streak with a 9–6 win the following day. Prior to the series finale, Edwin Encarnación was suspended for one game after bumping into umpire Vic Carapazza on Canada Day. Encarnación appealed the suspension, and was allowed to play. In the game, the high-octane Toronto offence would crush Corey Kluber and the Indians by a score of 17–1. J. A. Happ became the Blue Jays' first pitcher with eleven wins prior to the All-Star break since Roy Halladay in 2008. The Blue Jays then battled the Kansas City Royals in a rematch of the 2015 ALCS. Aaron Sanchez earned his ninth win of the season in the first game of the three-game series, holding the Royals to one run over his eight innings pitched. The Blue Jays would prevail in the second game, 8–3, led by a two-home run game from Josh Donaldson. During the game, the starting and reserve rosters for the 2016 All-Star Game were announced. Donaldson, Edwin Encarnación, and Marco Estrada were all named as All-Star reserves. In addition, Michael Saunders was named as one of five American League Final Vote candidates. Marcus Stroman would lead the Jays to a sweep of the Royals with a 4–2 victory in the final game. To close out the unofficial first half of the season, Toronto took on the Detroit Tigers for four games. The Blue Jays would come from behind in the first game of the series, with Troy Tulowitzki driving in the tying and go-ahead runs in the bottom of the eighth inning. Roberto Osuna would close out the 5–4 victory. Prior to the second game, Saunders was announced as the Final Vote winner, and became the fourth Toronto representative for the All-Star game. J. A. Happ would lead the Blue Jays to a 6–0 victory that night, earning his twelfth win of the season and tying his career-high in wins. The Tigers would end Toronto's seven-game winning streak the following day, winning 3–2. After the game, Aaron Sanchez was named as Craig Kimbrel's replacement to the All-Star Game. In the final game before the All-Star break, R. A. Dickey would hold the Tigers offence to a single run in a 6–1 Blue Jays victory. Edwin Encarnación sat out of this game after choosing to drop his appeal of the one-game suspension he received earlier in the month.

Following the All-Star break, the Blue Jays visited Oakland to play three games against the Athletics. The Blue Jays lost the very back-and-forth first game 8–7, despite leading 7–3 earlier on. They also lost the second game, 5–4; as R. A. Dickey allowed all of Oakland's runs on three home runs. The Jays avoided getting swept, winning the finale 5–3 after Josh Donaldson doubled in the ninth inning to take the lead. Following an off day, the Blue Jays played a two-game series in Arizona against the Diamondbacks. In the first game, Aaron Sanchez pitched seven innings and only surrendered one run, while Edwin Encarnación, who has a history of hitting well in Arizona, hit a three-run home run, helping Toronto win 5–1. The Jays completed the sweep the next day, this time winning 10–4, backed by eight strong innings from Marcus Stroman, who only allowed one run.

The Blue Jays returned home for a nine-game homestand to close out the month of July. Facing the Seattle Mariners for the first time in 2016, the Toronto offence was stymied by James Paxton and the Seattle bullpen, losing the first game 2–1. R. A. Dickey had the shortest outing of his Blue Jays career in the second game, going only three innings and allowing six earned runs, including a grand slam to Nelson Cruz. Seattle would score five more runs off Jesse Chavez and three off Drew Storen to take the second game of the series, 14–5. The Blue Jays would avoid being swept, winning the final game of the series 2–0. J. A. Happ earned his thirteenth win of the season, establishing a new career-high in wins. Shortly before the start of the third game against Seattle, Drew Storen was designated for assignment. With trade rumours swirling, the Blue Jays took on the San Diego Padres for three games, which were the first games for the Padres in Toronto in franchise history. Aaron Sanchez earned his tenth consecutive winning decision, leading Toronto to a 4–2 victory with seven strong innings. Before the start of the second game, the Blue Jays and San Diego made a trade, with the Padres sending Melvin Upton Jr. and cash considerations to the Blue Jays for minor league pitcher Hansel Rodriguez. Upton would make his debut with the Jays in the seventh inning of the game, pinch-hitting and grounding into a fielder's choice. Tied 4–4, the game went into the twelfth inning, where Matt Kemp hit a two-run home run to give the Padres a 6–4 lead. However, the Blue Jays would battle back, scoring on a bases-loaded walk by José Bautista and a fielder's choice groundout by Josh Donaldson, before Devon Travis would score the winning run on a wild pitch to take the game, 7–6. Immediately following the game, the Blue Jays announced another trade. Drew Storen was sent to the Seattle Mariners in exchange for Joaquín Benoit. The Padres would come out on top in the final game of the series, hitting two home runs off starter R. A. Dickey to win 8–4. The two home runs increased Dickey's total to 26 on the season, which tied him for the league-lead in home runs allowed. The Blue Jays wrapped July by hosting the Baltimore Orioles, whom they trailed by 1 games for the AL East lead, for a critical three-game series. The Blue Jays won the first game 6–5, aided by three solo home runs in the first inning and cutting the Orioles' division lead to half a game. The next day, the Toronto defeated Baltimore 9–1, after scoring seven runs in the fifth inning and took a half-game lead in the division. The Blue Jays would not complete the sweep and would lose their division lead in the final match of the series, giving up a 2–0 lead and eventually losing 6–2 in the twelfth inning. Troy Tulowitzki suffered a chip-fracture in his right thumb after being hit by a pitch, and left the game.

August

The Blue Jays opened August with a four-game series in Houston. Prior to the game, the Blue Jays made three trades before the 4 p.m. ET trade deadline. The first trade sent Jesse Chavez and cash considerations to the Los Angeles Dodgers for pitcher Mike Bolsinger. Shortly after, the Jays made a trade with the Astros, sending minor league pitcher Guadalupe Chavez to Houston for Scott Feldman. With one minute remaining before the deadline, the Blue Jays traded Drew Hutchison to the Pittsburgh Pirates for Francisco Liriano, Reese McGuire, and Harold Ramírez. The game against the Astros that night went tied 1–1 into extra innings. Scott Feldman ended up taking the loss for Toronto, yielding a lead-off single to José Altuve before Carlos Correa knocked him in with a walk-off double in the fourteenth inning. Marcus Stroman set a new career-high with 13 strikeouts in the game. José Bautista hit his 300th career home run in the second game of the series as Toronto won 2–1, aided by a strong pitching performance from R. A. Dickey. Marco Estrada would hold Houston to a single run in the third game of the series, and the offence would hit three solo home runs to win 3–1. The Blue Jays would capture the series in the final game, winning 4–1. Edwin Encarnación hit his 30th home run of the season, and J. A. Happ earned his 15th win, tying Stephen Strasburg for the MLB lead. To close their road trip, the Blue Jays played three games in Kauffman Stadium against the Royals in Kansas City, Missouri. Devon Travis hit a leadoff home run in the first game to give the Jays an early lead, and in the ninth inning, he would hit a go-ahead home run to lead Toronto to a 4–3 win. Aaron Sanchez had his ten-game winning streak spanned by the Royals in the second game, losing 4–2. The Royals would take the series with a 7–1 win over the Blue Jays in the finale.

Returning home from a road trip that saw just 17 total runs of offence, the Blue Jays battled the Rays for three games. Devon Travis led the way in the first game, recording four hits for the first time in his career as the Blue Jays topped the Rays, 7–5. The Rays would get the better of Marco Estrada and the Toronto bullpen in the second game, handing the Jays a 9–2 loss. In the series finale, J. A. Happ became the season's first 16-game winner, shutting out Tampa over six innings in a 7–0 win. As the Orioles lost their game to Oakland later that night, the victory put Toronto in first place by a full game for the first time in the 2016 season. Looking to expand their division lead, the Jays took on the Astros once again. Former Blue Jays draftee Joe Musgrove made the start in the first game for Houston and pitched seven innings to lead the Astros to a 5–3 win over Toronto. Aaron Sanchez put the Blue Jays in a 2–0 hole to begin the second game, but regrouped and pitched seven strong innings. Russell Martin would hit a three-run home run late in the game to lift the Blue Jays to a 4–2 victory. Roberto Osuna earned his 46th career save in the win, tying Terry Forster's record for saves prior to a pitcher's 22nd birthday. The Jays would take the series with a 9–2 win in the finale, led by a strong pitching performance by Marcus Stroman and home runs from Edwin Encarnación, Troy Tulowitzki, and Russell Martin.

Embarking on their second road trip of August, the Blue Jays went to New York to take on the Yankees. Entering the series, the Jays had won four consecutive series at Yankee Stadium. Rookie Chad Green started the first game of the series for New York and dominated the Blue Jays, pitching six shutout innings and striking out eleven in a 1–0 win. In the second game, the Yankees took a 5–0 lead into a 45-minute rain delay. After the rain, Scott Feldman would give up another run to New York before the Toronto offence would score 12 unanswered runs to win 12–6. Russell Martin hit two home runs and Troy Tulowitzki had four hits in a game for the first time as a Blue Jay. Toronto would take the third and final game of the series by a score of 7–4, giving J. A. Happ his 17th win, which broke a tie with Rick Porcello for the league-lead. The Blue Jays became the sixth team in MLB history to win five consecutive road series against the Yankees, and the first since the Cleveland Indians in 1969. Coincidentally, the Blue Jays then travelled to Cleveland to play the Indians for three games in what some considered to be a playoff preview. Toronto took a 2–1 lead into the ninth inning of the first game, before Roberto Osuna allowed back-to-back solo home runs to give Cleveland the 3–2 victory. In the second game, the Blue Jays again took a one run lead into the ninth inning, however this time Osuna would close the game without issue, leading the Jays to a 6–5 win. Prior to the series finale, the Blue Jays optioned Aaron Sanchez to the Advanced-A Dunedin Blue Jays to skip his next start, limit his innings, and allow his roster space to be used by Aaron Loup. Brett Cecil would be called upon to pitch the eighth inning of the finale, and protect a 2–1 lead. Cecil would allow a two-run home run to José Ramírez that gave the Indians a 3–2 lead they would not relinquish.

Coming back to Toronto with a 3–3 record over their road trip, the Blue Jays battled the last-place Los Angeles Angels of Anaheim for the first time in 2016. R. A. Dickey held the Angels to a single run over 6 innings, leading Toronto to a 7–2 win. The Angels offence got to Marco Estrada early and often in the second game of the series, tagging him for a season-high ten hits and six runs and defeating the Jays 8–2. In the rubber match, the Angels handed J. A. Happ his first loss since June, taking the game and the series, 6–3. Hoping to bounce back from a disappointing series against one last-place team, Toronto then took on another last-place team in the Minnesota Twins. The first game would see a resurgence for the Blue Jays offence, as Justin Smoak and Russell Martin each recorded 5 RBI to lead the Jays to a 15–8 victory. The Blue Jays trailed the Twins 5–1 in the next match of the series, before working their way back into the game. Down 7–6 in the bottom of the eighth inning, Melvin Upton Jr. hit a triple and came in to score on an error by Max Kepler on the play, giving Toronto an 8–7 lead that they would successfully hold. The Blue Jays would complete the sweep with another come-from-behind victory, winning 9–6, and taking a two-game lead over the Red Sox for the division lead. Josh Donaldson hit three home runs for the first time in his career, and was showered with baseball caps from the fans after completing the hat-trick.

Bringing August to a close, the Blue Jays embarked upon a crucial nine-game road trip against three AL East teams, beginning with the Baltimore Orioles. Marco Estrada would yield just a single run to the Baltimore offence, and Josh Donaldson would homer for the fourth time in two games to lead Toronto to a 5–1 win in the series opener. Dioner Navarro reported to the team before the game, and Josh Thole was designated for assignment to make room on the roster. The Orioles would take the second game, 5–3, with Matt Wieters hitting a go-ahead, two-run home run off Jason Grilli in the eighth inning. Aaron Sanchez was recalled from Advanced-A Dunedin to make the start in the series finale, and held the Orioles to a single unearned run through six innings of work. Sanchez would earn his 13th win of the season, as the Blue jays took the series, 5–3. Shortly before the end of the month, Josh Thole was re-signed by the Blue Jays, allowing him to maintain his postseason roster eligibility. To make room on the roster, Devon Travis was optioned to the Rookie-Advanced Bluefield Blue Jays.

September–October

After an off-day to begin September, the Blue Jays battled the Rays at Tropicana Field. As the Bluefield season ended on September 1, Devon Travis was able to be recalled without waiting ten days. In addition, the Blue Jays recalled Danny Barnes, Darrell Ceciliani, Dalton Pompey, and Ryan Tepera due to the September roster expansion, and added Matt Dermody to the roster. In the game against Tampa that night, the Rays took advantage of a shaky night for the Toronto pitching staff, taking the opener 8–3. Blake Snell held the Jays offence to a single run in the second game of the three-game series. The Blue Jays mounted a late-game comeback, scoring four runs in the ninth but fell short, losing 7–5. The loss moved Toronto into a tie with the Boston Red Sox, who defeated Oakland later that day, for the lead in the AL East. Toronto would avoid being swept by taking the third game by a score of 5–3, thanks in large part to 6 scoreless innings from the bullpen. Looking to rebound from another disappointing series in St. Petersburg, the Blue Jays took on the Yankees to close their road trip. R. A. Dickey allowed five runs in four innings pitched in the first game, giving the Yankees a 5–3 victory. Toronto held a 4–3 lead in the eighth inning before Jason Grilli yielded four runs to put the Jays down 7–4. The Blue Jays would battle back in the ninth, scoring two runs off Yankees closer Dellin Betances and loading the bases against his replacement, Blake Parker. Parker would end the game, getting Justin Smoak to flyout to the left field warning track and giving the Yankees a 7–6 win, which would be credited to relief pitcher Chasen Shreve. The Blue Jays would be swept for the first time on the road this season, losing the finale by a 2–0 score.

Coming home after a disappointing 3–6 road trip, the Blue Jays set their sights on the division-leading Red Sox. Marco Estrada continued to struggle, pitching just 2 innings and allowing four runs. The bullpen fared much worse, as Boston starter Rick Porcello became MLB's first 20-game winner of the 2016 season in a 13–3 Red Sox win. J. A. Happ held the high-powered Boston offence to two runs in six innings pitched in the second game, while Melvin Upton Jr. and José Bautista provided all the offence Toronto would need in a 3–2 win to break a four-game losing streak. Boston would take the final game of the three-game series, 11–8, giving Toronto three consecutive series losses. To end their six-game homestand, the Blue Jays took on Tampa for the last time in 2016. Ezequiel Carrera would hit a go-ahead, pinch hit solo home run in the eighth inning to give Toronto a 3–2 lead that they would not relinquish. The Rays pitching, as they had done several times in 2016, shut down the Blue Jays offence in the second game of the series, pitching to a 6–2 victory. In their final game against the Rays, the Blue Jays managed just two hits in an 8–1 loss that dropped their September record to a dismal 3–9. Josh Donaldson missed the entire series with a hip injury, and had an MRI during the final game.

In desperate need of wins, the Blue Jays began a west-coast road trip against the Los Angeles Angels of Anaheim. Josh Donaldson returned to the lineup and led the Jays to a 7–2 victory, with J. A. Happ picking up his 19th win of the season. R. A. Dickey, making possibly his final start as a Blue Jay, held the Angels scoreless over his five innings in Toronto's 5–0 win. The Angels would hold the Blue Jays to a single run in the third game, winning 6–1 and dropping the Jays to three games back of the division-leading Red Sox. Los Angeles would split the series, taking the fourth and final game 4–0. With the loss, Toronto fell four games back to Boston in the AL East. To close their road play on the west coast, the Blue Jays played a crucial series against the Seattle Mariners. Entering play, Toronto held the second wild-card spot, while the Mariners were two games back. With thousands of western Canadians making the trip to Seattle given Seattle's proximity to the Canadian border, Marco Estrada led the Jays to a 3–2 win in the first game. J. A. Happ became the sixth 20-game winner in Blue Jays franchise history in the second game of the series, winning 10–2. Russell Martin and Michael Saunders each hit home runs in the fourth inning to become the first Canadian teammates in MLB history to have 20 or more home runs in a season. The Mariners would avoid the sweep, taking the final game 2–1 in the twelfth inning. With the Orioles being swept by the Red Sox on Toronto's off day, the Jays moved into the first wild card position.

The Blue Jays returned to the Rogers Centre for their final homestand of the 2016 regular season; first by taking on the Yankees. The Toronto offence exploded in the first game, and Francisco Liriano had his best start as a Blue Jay, shutting out New York through his six innings in a 9–0 victory. The second game went tied 0–0 into the eighth inning, before José Bautista launched a three-run home run off Yankees reliever Tyler Clippard to lift Toronto to a 3–0 win. In the third game, Bautista hit a tie-breaking solo home run in the bottom of the eighth inning, giving the Blue Jays a 2–1 lead. In the ninth, the Yankees would score two runs off closer Roberto Osuna to take a 3–2 lead. With Tyler Clippard pitching for the second consecutive day, Ezequiel Carrera would tie the game with a perfectly executed safety squeeze before Edwin Encarnación hit a walk-off single to win 4–3. The final game was marred by two bench-clearing brawls in the second inning. Yankees starter Luis Severino hit Josh Donaldson on the elbow in the first inning, and J. A. Happ retaliated in the top of the second, first throwing behind Chase Headley and then hitting him on the hip. Home plate umpire Todd Tichenor issued a warning to both teams, and after the first uneventful brawl, Yankees manager Joe Girardi was ejected for arguing the warning. In the bottom half of the second, Severino threw behind Justin Smoak and then hit him, leading to the second brawl. Severino was immediately ejected, and after order had been restored Yankees pitching coach Larry Rothschild and bench coach Rob Thomson were also ejected. Toronto led 3–2 heading into the ninth inning, but New York would score five runs to take the lead. The Jays rally would fall short, as the Yankees avoided the sweep, 7–5. Holding the first wild-card position, the Blue Jays played their final regular season home series against Baltimore, who held the second wild-card spot entering play. Aaron Sanchez held the high-powered Orioles offence to a single run in the first game, striking out ten in a 5–1 victory. The Blue Jays would drop the second game, 3–2, despite taking a 2–1 lead into the ninth inning. With the Blue Jays loss, the Boston Red Sox clinched the division. Toronto was shut out in their final regular season home game, 4–0, and moved into a tie with Baltimore for the top wild-card position heading into the final weekend of the season.

Looking to ensure a postseason berth, the Blue Jays closed out the season by visiting the division-winning Boston Red Sox. Toronto lost the first game, 5–3, after Brett Cecil surrendered what would be David Ortiz's final regular-season home run. Baltimore also defeated New York, causing the Blue Jays to fall a game behind the Orioles for the top wild-card spot. The next day, Toronto defeated Boston, 4–3, thanks to a three-RBI night from Kevin Pillar. They also pulled back into a tie with Baltimore for the top wild-card after Baltimore lost to New York, enabling them to clinch the top wild-card spot with a win in the season finale. In the season finale, Aaron Sanchez carried a no-hitter into the seventh inning, and both Devon Travis and Troy Tulowitzki contributed with two-out hits, helping the Blue Jays win, 2–1. With Baltimore's win over New York, Toronto and Baltimore finished the season with identical 89–73 records; however, Toronto clinched the top wild-card spot based on their 10–9 head-to-head record against Baltimore in 2016.

Game log

|-  style="text-align:center; background:#bfb;"
| 1 || April 3 || @ Rays || 5–3 || Stroman (1–0) || Archer (0–1) || Osuna (1) || 31,042 || 1–0 || +½ 
|-  style="text-align:center; background:#bfb;"
| 2 || April 4 || @ Rays || 5–3 || Dickey (1–0) || Smyly (0–1) || Osuna (2) || 15,116 || 2–0 || +½
|-  style="text-align:center; background:#fbb;"
| 3 || April 5 || @ Rays || 2–3 || Colomé (1–0) || Cecil (0–1) || — || 12,757 || 2–1 || –
|-  style="text-align:center; background:#fbb;"
| 4 || April 6 || @ Rays || 3–5 || Ramírez (1–0) || Floyd (0–1) || — || 14,257 || 2–2 || 1
|-  style="text-align:center; background:#fbb;"
| 5 || April 8 || Red Sox || 7–8 || Barnes (1–0) || Storen (0–1) || Kimbrel (1) || 48,871 || 2–3 || 2½
|-  style="text-align:center; background:#fbb;"
| 6 || April 9 || Red Sox || 4–8 || Porcello (1–0) || Dickey (1–1) || — || 47,138 || 2–4 || 3
|-  style="text-align:center; background:#bfb;"
| 7 || April 10 || Red Sox || 3–0 || Estrada (1–0) || Wright (0–1) || Osuna (3) || 46,168 || 3–4 || 3
|-  style="text-align:center; background:#fbb;"
| 8 || April 12 || Yankees || 2–3 || Barbato (1–0) || Cecil (0–2) || Miller (2) || 28,819 || 3–5 || 4½
|-  style="text-align:center; background:#bfb;"
| 9 || April 13 || Yankees || 7–2 || Happ (1–0) || Pineda (1–1) || — || 27,938 || 4–5 || 3½
|-  style="text-align:center; background:#bfb;"
| 10 || April 14 || Yankees || 4–2 || Stroman (2–0) || Eovaldi (0–1) || Osuna (4) || 36,238 || 5–5 || 2½
|-  style="text-align:center; background:#fbb;"
| 11 || April 15 || @ Red Sox || 3–5 || Porcello (2–0) || Dickey (1–2) || Kimbrel (3) || 31,415 || 5–6 || 3½
|-  style="text-align:center; background:#fbb;"
| 12 || April 16 || @ Red Sox || 2–4 || Price (2–0) || Estrada (1–1) || Kimbrel (4) || 36,267 || 5–7 || 3½
|-  style="text-align:center; background:#bfb;"
| 13 || April 17 || @ Red Sox || 5–3 || Sanchez (1–0) || Wright (0–2) || — || 37,217 || 6–7 || 3 
|-  style="text-align:center; background:#bfb;"
| 14 || April 18 || @ Red Sox || 4–3 || Happ (2–0) || Uehara (0–1) || Storen (1) || 37,168 || 7–7 || 2½
|-  style="text-align:center; background:#bfb;"
| 15 || April 19 || @ Orioles || 4–3 || Stroman (3–0) || Wright (1–1) || Osuna (5) || 16,783 || 8–7 || 1½
|-  style="text-align:center; background:#fbb;"
| 16 || April 20 || @ Orioles || 3–4 (10) || Givens (1–0) || Biagini (0–1) || — || 15,404 || 8–8 || 2½
|-  style="text-align:center; background:#fbb;"
| 17 || April 21 || @ Orioles || 2–3 || O'Day (1–0) || Cecil (0–3) || Britton (4) || 17,644 || 8–9 || 3½
|-  style="text-align:center; background:#fbb;"
| 18 || April 22 || Athletics || 5–8 || Gray (3–1) || Sanchez (1–1) || Madson (7) || 34,251 || 8–10 || 3½
|-  style="text-align:center; background:#bfb;"
| 19 || April 23 || Athletics || 9–3 || Happ (3–0) || Bassitt (0–1) || — || 46,334 || 9–10 || 3½
|-  style="text-align:center; background:#bfb;"
| 20 || April 24 || Athletics || 6–3 || Hutchison (1–0) || Surkamp (0–2) || Osuna (6) || 46,300 || 10–10 || 2½
|-  style="text-align:center; background:#fbb;"
| 21 || April 25 || White Sox || 5–7 || Putnam (1–0) || Cecil (0–4) || Robertson (8) || 24,333 || 10–11 || 2½
|-  style="text-align:center; background:#fbb;"
| 22 || April 26 || White Sox || 1–10 || Sale (5–0) || Dickey (1–3) || — || 23,726 || 10–12 || 2½
|-  style="text-align:center; background:#fbb;"
| 23 || April 27 || White Sox || 0–4 || Quintana (3–1) || Estrada (1–2) || — || 28,759 || 10–13 || 3½
|-  style="text-align:center; background:#bfb;"
| 24 || April 29 || @ Rays || 6–1 || Sanchez (2–1) || Smyly (1–3) || — || 13,679 || 11–13 || 4 
|-  style="text-align:center; background:#fbb;"
| 25 || April 30 || @ Rays || 3–4 || Cedeño (2–0) || Cecil (0–5) || — || 14,948 || 11–14 || 4
|-

|-  style="text-align:center; background:#bfb;"
| 26 || May 1 || @ Rays || 5–1 || Stroman (4–0) || Cedeño (2–1) || — || 27,217 || 12–14 || 3½
|-  style="text-align:center; background:#fbb;"
| 27 || May 2 || Rangers || 1–2 || Barnette (1–1) || Floyd (0–2) || Tolleson (9) || 25,323 || 12–15 || 4
|-  style="text-align:center; background:#bfb;"
| 28 || May 3 || Rangers || 3–1 (10) || Biagini (1–1) || Klein (0–1) || — || 24,437 || 13–15 || 3½
|-  style="text-align:center; background:#bfb;"
| 29 || May 4 || Rangers || 4–3 || Osuna (1–0) || Barnette (1–2) || — || 25,229 || 14–15 || 3
|-  style="text-align:center; background:#bfb;"
| 30 || May 5 || Rangers || 12–2 || Happ (4–0) || Holland (3–2) || — || 35,468 || 15–15 || 3
|-  style="text-align:center; background:#bfb;"
| 31 || May 6 || Dodgers || 5–2 || Floyd (1–2) || Blanton (2–2) || Storen (2) || 42,304 || 16–15 || 2
|-  style="text-align:center; background:#fbb;"
| 32 || May 7 || Dodgers || 2–6 || Kershaw (4–1) || Dickey (1–4) || — || 47,156 || 16–16 || 2½
|-  style="text-align:center; background:#fbb;"
| 33 || May 8 || Dodgers || 2–4 || Hatcher (3–3) || Storen (0–2) || Jansen (11) || 46,665 || 16–17 || 3½
|-  style="text-align:center; background:#bfb;"
| 34 || May 9 || @ Giants || 3–1 || Sanchez (3–1) || Peavy (1–4) || Osuna (7) || 41,256 || 17–17 || 3
|-  style="text-align:center; background:#bfb;"
| 35 || May 10 || @ Giants || 4–0 || Happ (5–0) || Cain (0–5) || Osuna (8) || 41,464 || 18–17 || 3 
|-  style="text-align:center; background:#fbb;"
| 36 || May 11 || @ Giants || 4–5 (13) || Suárez (1–0) || Tepera (0–1) || — || 41,372 || 18–18 || 4
|-  style="text-align:center; background:#bfb;"
| 37 || May 13 || @ Rangers || 5–0 || Dickey (2–4) || Pérez (1–3) || — || 40,344 || 19–18 || 4½
|-  style="text-align:center; background:#fbb;"
| 38 || May 14 || @ Rangers || 5–6 (10) || Barnette (3–2) || Floyd (1–3) || — || 47,115 || 19–19 || 5½
|-  style="text-align:center; background:#fbb;"
| 39 || May 15 || @ Rangers || 6–7 || Bush (1–0) || Chavez (0–1) || Dyson (2) || 41,327 || 19–20 || 5½
|-  style="text-align:center; background:#fbb;"
| 40 || May 16 || Rays || 2–13 || Smyly (2–4) || Happ (5–1) || — || 26,516 || 19–21 || 6
|-  style="text-align:center; background:#fbb;"
| 41 || May 17 || Rays || 2–12 || Archer (3–4) || Stroman (4–1) || — || 27,521 || 19–22 || 6 
|-  style="text-align:center; background:#fbb;"
| 42 || May 18 || Rays || 3–6 || Odorizzi (1–2) || Dickey (2–5) || Colomé (10) || 29,078 || 19–23 || 7
|-  style="text-align:center; background:#bfb;"
| 43 || May 19 || @ Twins || 3–2 (11) || Osuna (2–0) || Pressly (1–3) || Biagini (1) || 25,435 || 20–23 || 6
|-  style="text-align:center; background:#bfb;"
| 44 || May 20 || @ Twins || 9–3 || Sanchez (4–1) || Duffey (1–3) || — || 29,396 || 21–23 || 6
|-  style="text-align:center; background:#fbb;"
| 45 || May 21 || @ Twins || 3–5 || Abad (1–0) || Happ (5–2) || Jepsen (3) || 30,460 || 21–24 || 7
|-  style="text-align:center; background:#bfb;"
| 46 || May 22 || @ Twins || 3–1 || Stroman (5–1) || Hughes (1–7) || Osuna (9) || 33,421 || 22–24 || 6 
|-  style="text-align:center; background:#fbb;"
| 47 || May 24 || @ Yankees || 0–6 || Eovaldi (5–2) || Dickey (2–6) || — || 35,174 || 22–25 || 7
|-  style="text-align:center; background:#bfb;"
| 48 || May 25 || @ Yankees || 8–4 || Estrada (2–2) || Nova (3–2) || — || 38,959 || 23–25 || 7
|-  style="text-align:center; background:#bfb;"
| 49 || May 26 || @ Yankees || 3–1 || Happ (6–2) || Sabathia (3–3) || Osuna (10) || 38,391 || 24–25 || 6
|-  style="text-align:center; background:#bfb;"
| 50 || May 27 || Red Sox || 7–5 || Biagini (2–1) || Uehara (2–2) || Osuna (11) || 46,470 || 25–25 || 5
|-  style="text-align:center; background:#bfb;"
| 51 || May 28 || Red Sox || 10–9 || Floyd (2–3) || Kimbrel (0–2) || — || 48,154 || 26–25 || 4 
|-  style="text-align:center; background:#fbb;"
| 52 || May 29 || Red Sox || 3–5 (11) || Buchholz (3–5) || Floyd (2–4) || Uehara (1) || 47,916 || 26–26 || 5
|-  style="text-align:center; background:#bfb;"
| 53 || May 30 || Yankees || 4–2 || Estrada (3–2) || Nova (3–3) || Storen (3) || 32,921 || 27–26 || 5 
|-  style="text-align:center; background:#bfb;"
| 54 || May 31 || Yankees || 4–1 || Biagini (3–1) || Sabathia (3–4) || Osuna (12) || 33,419 || 28–26 || 5 
|-

|-  style="text-align:center; background:#bfb;"
| 55 || June 1 || Yankees || 7–0 || Sanchez (5–1) || Tanaka (3–1) || — || 39,512 || 29–26 || 4
|-  style="text-align:center; background:#bfb;"
| 56 || June 3 || @ Red Sox || 5–2 || Dickey (3–6) || Price (7–2) || Osuna (13) || 37,129 || 30–26 || 2½
|-  style="text-align:center; background:#fbb;"
| 57 || June 4 || @ Red Sox || 4–6 || Wright (6–4) || Stroman (5–2) || Kimbrel (13) || 37,762 || 30–27 || 3½
|-  style="text-align:center; background:#bfb;"
| 58 || June 5 || @ Red Sox || 5–4 || Estrada (4–2) || Rodríguez (1–1) || — || 35,823 || 31–27 || 2½
|-  style="text-align:center; background:#fbb;"
| 59 || June 6 || @ Tigers || 0–11 || Fulmer (6–1) || Happ (6–3) || — || 29,771 || 31–28 || 3½
|-  style="text-align:center; background:#fbb;"
| 60 || June 7 || @ Tigers || 2–3 (10) || Wilson (2–1) || Biagini (3–2) || — || 30,745 || 31–29 || 4½
|-  style="text-align:center; background:#bfb;"
| 61 || June 8 || @ Tigers || 7–2 || Dickey (4–6) || Zimmermann (8–3) || — || 36,036 || 32–29 || 4½
|-  style="text-align:center; background:#fbb;"
| 62 || June 9 || Orioles || 5–6 || Bundy (2–1) || Osuna (2–1) || Britton (19) || 41,448 || 32–30 || 5½
|-  style="text-align:center; background:#bfb;"
| 63 || June 10 || Orioles || 4–3 (10) || Storen (1–2) || Brach (5–1) || — || 44,439 || 33–30 || 4½
|-  style="text-align:center; background:#bfb;"
| 64 || June 11 || Orioles || 11–6 || Happ (7–3) || McFarland (1–2) || — || 47,651 || 34–30 || 3½
|-  style="text-align:center; background:#bfb;"
| 65 || June 12 || Orioles || 10–9 || Sanchez (6–1) || Jiménez (3–7) || Grilli (3) || 47,249 || 35–30 || 2½
|-  style="text-align:center; background:#fbb;"
| 66 || June 13 || Phillies || 0–7 || Eickhoff (4–8) || Dickey (4–7) || — || 35,678 || 35–31 || 3 
|-  style="text-align:center; background:#bfb;"
| 67 || June 14 || Phillies || 11–3 || Stroman (6–2) || Eflin (0–1) || — || 47,066 || 36–31 || 3
|-  style="text-align:center; background:#bfb;"
| 68 || June 15 || @ Phillies || 7–2 || Estrada (5–2) || Hellickson (4–5) || — || 24,753 || 37–31 || 2
|-  style="text-align:center; background:#bfb;"
| 69 || June 16 || @ Philles || 13–2 || Happ (8–3) || Nola (5–6) || — || 22,279 || 38–31 || 2
|-  style="text-align:center; background:#bfb;"
| 70 || June 17 || @ Orioles || 13–3 || Sanchez (7–1) || Wright (3–4) || — || 38,306 || 39–31 || 1 
|-  style="text-align:center; background:#fbb;"
| 71 || June 18 || @ Orioles || 2–4 || Gallardo (2–1) || Dickey (4–8) || Britton (21) || 41,901 || 39–32 || 2 
|-  style="text-align:center; background:#fbb;"
| 72 || June 19 || @ Orioles || 6–11 || Tillman (10–1) || Stroman (6–3) || — || 39,024 || 39–33 || 3 
|-  style="text-align:center; background:#fbb;"
| 73 || June 21 || Diamondbacks || 2–4 || Corbin (4–6) || Estrada (5–3) ||  Hudson (1) || 41,838 || 39–34 || 2½
|-  style="text-align:center; background:#bfb;"
| 74 || June 22 || Diamondbacks || 5–2 || Happ (9–3) || Ray (4–6) || Osuna (14) || 46,967 || 40–34 || 2½
|-  style="text-align:center; background:#fbb;"
| 75 || June 24 || @ White Sox || 2–3 || Jones (3–2) || Chavez (0–2) || Robertson (19) || 27,196 || 40–35 || 3½
|-  style="text-align:center; background:#bfb;"
| 76 || June 25 || @ White Sox || 10–8 || Dickey (5–8) || González (1–3) || Osuna (15) || 25,776 || 41–35 || 4
|-  style="text-align:center; background:#fbb;"
| 77 || June 26 || @ White Sox || 2–5 || Sale (13–2) || Stroman (6–4) || Robertson (20) || 28,345 || 41–36 || 5 
|-  style="text-align:center; background:#fbb;"
| 78 || June 27 || @ Rockies || 5–9 || Gray (5–3) || Storen (1–3) || — || 36,419 || 41–37 || 5½
|-  style="text-align:center; background:#bfb;"
| 79 || June 28 || @ Rockies || 14–9 || Happ (10–3) || Butler (2–5) ||  || 33,917 || 42–37 || 5½
|-  style="text-align:center; background:#bfb;"
| 80 || June 29 || @ Rockies || 5–3 || Sanchez (8–1) || Anderson (0–2) || — || 38,412 || 43–37 || 5½
|-  style="text-align:center; background:#fbb;"
| 81 || June 30 || Indians || 1–4 || Carrasco (4–2) || Dickey (5–9) || Allen (17) || 41,365 || 43–38 || 5½
|-

|-  style="text-align:center; background:#fbb;"
| 82 || July 1 || Indians || 1–2 (19) || Bauer (7–2) || Barney (0–1) || — || 45,825 || 43–39 || 5½
|-  style="text-align:center; background:#bfb;"
| 83 || July 2 || Indians || 9–6 || Grilli (2–2) || Otero (2–1) || Osuna (16) || 46,197 || 44–39 || 4½
|-  style="text-align:center; background:#bfb;"
| 84 || July 3 || Indians || 17–1 || Happ (11–3) || Kluber (8–8) || — || 45,962 || 45–39 || 3½
|-  style="text-align:center; background:#bfb;"
| 85 || July 4 || Royals || 6–2 || Sanchez (9–1) || Vólquez (7–8) || — || 36,438 || 46–39 || 2½
|-  style="text-align:center; background:#bfb;"
| 86 || July 5 || Royals || 8–3 || Dickey (6–9) || Young (2–8) || — || 35,917 || 47–39 || 2½
|-  style="text-align:center; background:#bfb;"
| 87 || July 6 || Royals || 4–2 || Stroman (7–4) || Herrera (1–2) || Osuna (17) || 39,971 || 48–39 || 2½
|-  style="text-align:center; background:#bfb;"
| 88 || July 7 || Tigers || 5–4 || Grilli (3–2) || Wilson (2–2) || Osuna (18) || 46,283 || 49–39 || 2
|-  style="text-align:center; background:#bfb;"
| 89 || July 8 || Tigers || 6–0 || Happ (12–3) || Pelfrey (2–8) || — || 43,228 || 50–39 || 1
|-  style="text-align:center; background:#fbb;"
| 90 || July 9 || Tigers || 2–3 || Rondón (3–1) || Grilli (3–3) || Rodríguez (24) || 47,684 || 50–40 || 2
|-  style="text-align:center; background:#bfb;"
| 91 || July 10 || Tigers || 6–1 || Dickey (7–9) || Sánchez (5–10) || — || 47,747 || 51–40 || 2
|-  style="text-align:center; background:#fbb;"
| 92 || July 15 || @ Athletics || 7–8 || Dull (3–2) || Cecil (0–6) || Madson (18) || 19,192 || 51–41 || 3 
|-  style="text-align:center; background:#fbb;"
| 93 || July 16 || @ Athletics || 4–5 || Gray (4–8) || Dickey (7–10) || Madson (19) || 27,510 || 51–42 || 4
|-  style="text-align:center; background:#bfb;"
| 94 || July 17 || @ Athletics || 5–3 || Grilli (4–3) || Axford (3–3) || Osuna (19) || 21,626 || 52–42 || 3
|-  style="text-align:center; background:#bfb;"
| 95 || July 19 || @ Diamondbacks || 5–1 || Sanchez (10–1) || Godley (2–1) || — || 26,626 || 53–42 || 1½
|-  style="text-align:center; background:#bfb;"
| 96 || July 20 || @ Diamondbacks || 10–4 || Stroman (8–4) || Corbin (4–9) || — || 20,076 || 54–42 || 1
|-  style="text-align:center; background:#fbb;"
| 97 || July 22 || Mariners || 1–2 || Paxton (3–4) || Estrada (5–4) || Cishek (23) || 46,737 || 54–43 || 2
|-  style="text-align:center; background:#fbb;"
| 98 || July 23 || Mariners || 5–14 || Iwakuma (11–6) || Dickey (7–11) || LeBlanc (1) || 47,517 || 54–44 || 3
|-  style="text-align:center; background:#bfb;"
| 99 || July 24 || Mariners || 2–0 || Happ (13–3) || Miley (6–8) || Osuna (20) || 47,488 || 55–44 || 3
|-  style="text-align:center; background:#bfb;"
| 100 || July 25 || Padres || 4–2 || Sanchez (11–1) || Rea (5–5) || Osuna (21) || 41,483 || 56–44 || 3
|-  style="text-align:center; background:#bfb;"
| 101 || July 26 || Padres || 7–6 (12) || Chavez (1–2) || Villanueva (1–2) || — || 45,515 || 57–44 || 2
|-  style="text-align:center; background:#fbb;"
| 102 || July 27 || Padres || 4–8 || Perdomo (5–4) || Dickey (7–12) || — || 47,301 || 57–45 || 2
|-  style="text-align:center; background:#bfb;"
| 103 || July 29 || Orioles || 6–5 || Estrada (6–4) || Gausman (2–8) || Osuna (22) || 46,112 || 58–45 || ½
|-  style="text-align:center; background:#bfb;"
| 104 || July 30 || Orioles || 9–1 || Happ (14–3) || Gallardo (3–3) || — || 47,305 || 59–45 || +½
|-  style="text-align:center; background:#fbb;"
| 105 || July 31 || Orioles || 2–6 (12) || Givens (8–1) || Morales (0–1) || — || 46,792 || 59–46 || ½
|-

|-  style="text-align:center; background:#fbb;"
| 106 || August 1 || @ Astros || 1–2 (14) || Feliz (7–1) || Feldman (5–4) || — || 20,623 || 59–47 || 1 
|-  style="text-align:center; background:#bfb;"
| 107 || August 2 || @ Astros || 2–1 || Dickey (8–12) || McCullers Jr. (6–5) || Grilli (4) || 24,399 || 60–47 || 1
|-  style="text-align:center; background:#bfb;"
| 108 || August 3 || @ Astros || 3–1 || Estrada (7–4) || McHugh (7–8) || Osuna (23) || 29,399 || 61–47 || 1
|-  style="text-align:center; background:#bfb;"
| 109 || August 4 || @ Astros || 4–1 || Happ (15–3) || Fiers (7–5) || Osuna (24) || 23,190 || 62–47 || – 
|-  style="text-align:center; background:#bfb;"
| 110 || August 5 || @ Royals || 4–3 || Cecil (1–6) || Herrera (1–3) || Benoit (1) || 31,831 || 63–47 || –
|-  style="text-align:center; background:#fbb;"
| 111 || August 6 || @ Royals || 2–4 || Duffy (8–1) || Sanchez (11–2) || Herrera (4) || 35,986 || 63–48 || –
|-  style="text-align:center; background:#fbb;"
| 112 || August 7 || @ Royals || 1–7 || Ventura (7–9) || Stroman (8–5) || — || 25,830 || 63–49 || 1
|-  style="text-align:center; background:#bfb;"
| 113 || August 8 || Rays || 7–5 || Benoit (2–1) || Cedeño (3–4) || Osuna (25) || 43,812 || 64–49 || –
|-  style="text-align:center; background:#fbb;"
| 114 || August 9 || Rays || 2–9 || Smyly (4–11) || Estrada (7–5) || Ramírez (1) || 43,134 || 64–50 || – 
|-  style="text-align:center; background:#bfb;"
| 115 || August 10 || Rays || 7–0 || Happ (16–3) || Snell (3–5) || — || 45,501 || 65–50 || +1
|-  style="text-align:center; background:#fbb;"
| 116 || August 12 || Astros || 3–5 || Musgrove (1–0) || Liriano (6–12) || Harris (12) || 46,330 || 65–51 || ½
|-  style="text-align:center; background:#bfb;"
| 117 || August 13 || Astros || 4–2 || Sanchez (12–2) || McHugh (7–10) || Osuna (26) || 47,505 || 66–51 || +½
|-  style="text-align:center; background:#bfb;"
| 118 || August 14 || Astros || 9–2 || Stroman (9–5) || Fiers (8–6) || — || 47,261 || 67–51 || +½
|-  style="text-align:center; background:#fbb;"
| 119 || August 15 || @ Yankees || 0–1 || Green (2–2) || Dickey (8–13) || Betances (5) || 36,015 || 67–52 || – 
|-  style="text-align:center; background:#bfb;"
| 120 || August 16 || @ Yankees || 12–6 || Feldman (6–4) || Warren (4–3) || — || 31,874 || 68–52 || +1 
|-  style="text-align:center; background:#bfb;"
| 121 || August 17 || @ Yankees || 7–4 || Happ (17–3) || Sabathia (7–10) || Osuna (27) || 37,736 || 69–52 || +1 
|-  style="text-align:center; background:#fbb;"
| 122 || August 19 || @ Indians || 2–3 || Manship (2–1) || Osuna (2–2) || — || 30,665 || 69–53 || +½
|-  style="text-align:center; background:#bfb;"
| 123 || August 20 || @ Indians || 6–5 || Biagini (4–2) || Tomlin (11–7) || Osuna (28) || 33,604 || 70–53 || +½
|-  style="text-align:center; background:#fbb;"
| 124 || August 21 || @ Indians || 2–3 || Clevinger (2–1) || Cecil (1–7) || Allen (24) || 26,696 || 70–54 || +½
|-  style="text-align:center; background:#bfb;"
| 125 || August 23 || Angels || 7–2 || Dickey (9–13) || Skaggs (1–3) || — || 46,696 || 71–54 || – 
|-  style="text-align:center; background:#fbb;"
| 126 || August 24 || Angels || 2–8 || Shoemaker (8–13) || Estrada (7–6) || — || 44,404 || 71–55 || –
|-  style="text-align:center; background:#fbb;"
| 127 || August 25 || Angels || 3–6 || Weaver (9–11) || Happ (17–4) || — || 46,273 || 71–56 || – 
|-  style="text-align:center; background:#bfb;"
| 128 || August 26 || Twins || 15–8 || Liriano (7–12) || Dean (1–4) || — || 42,534 || 72–56 || +1
|-  style="text-align:center; background:#bfb;"
| 129 || August 27 || Twins || 8–7 || Grilli (5–3) || Pressly (6–6) || Osuna (29) || 47,485 || 73–56 || +1
|-  style="text-align:center; background:#bfb;"
| 130 || August 28 || Twins || 9–6 || Feldman (7–4) || Light (0–1) || — || 47,444 || 74–56 || +2
|-  style="text-align:center; background:#bfb;"
| 131 || August 29 || @ Orioles || 5–1 || Estrada (8–6) || Miley (8–11) || — || 15,532 || 75–56 || +2
|-  style="text-align:center; background:#fbb;"
| 132 || August 30 || @ Orioles || 3–5 || Brach (8–2) || Grilli (5–4) || Britton (39) || 16,083 || 75–57 || +2
|-  style="text-align:center; background:#bfb;"
| 133 || August 31 || @ Orioles || 5–3 || Sanchez (13–2) || Gallardo (4–7) || — || 16,161 || 76–57 || +2 
|-

|-  style="text-align:center; background:#fbb;"
| 134 || September 2 || @ Rays || 3–8 || Farquhar (1–0) || Stroman (9–6) || — || 12,602 || 76–58 || +1 
|-  style="text-align:center; background:#fbb;"
| 135 || September 3 || @ Rays || 5–7 || Snell (5–7) || Estrada (8–7) || Colomé (30) || 14,353 || 76–59 || –
|-  style="text-align:center; background:#bfb;"
| 136 || September 4 || @ Rays || 5–3 || Benoit (3–1) || Jepsen (2–6) || Osuna (30) || 13,884 || 77–59 || +1
|-  style="text-align:center; background:#fbb;"
| 137 || September 5 || @ Yankees || 3–5 || Tanaka (12–4) || Dickey (9–14) || Betances (9) || 42,141 || 77–60 || +1
|-  style="text-align:center; background:#fbb;"
| 138 || September 6 || @ Yankees || 6–7 || Shreve (2–1) || Grilli (5–5) || Parker (1) || 27,532 || 77–61 || –
|-  style="text-align:center; background:#fbb;"
| 139 || September 7 || @ Yankees || 0–2 || Mitchell (1–0) || Stroman (9–7) || Clippard (2) || 30,501 || 77–62 || 1 
|-  style="text-align:center; background:#fbb;"
| 140 || September 9 || Red Sox || 3–13 || Porcello (20–3)  || Estrada (8–8) || — || 46,953 || 77–63 || 2
|-  style="text-align:center; background:#bfb;"
| 141 || September 10 || Red Sox || 3–2 || Happ (18–4) || Rodríguez (2–7)  || Osuna (31) || 47,829 || 78–63 || 1 
|-  style="text-align:center; background:#fbb;"
| 142 || September 11 || Red Sox || 8–11 || Ross Jr. (3–2) || Schultz (0–1) || Kimbrel (25) || 47,816 || 78–64 || 2 
|-  style="text-align:center; background:#bfb;"
| 143 || September 12 || Rays || 3–2 || Grilli (6–5) || Boxberger (3–1) || Osuna (32) || 35,333 || 79–64 || 2
|-  style="text-align:center; background:#fbb;"
| 144 || September 13 || Rays || 2–6 || Smyly (7–11) || Stroman (9–8) || — || 38,338 || 79–65 || 2 
|-  style="text-align:center; background:#fbb;"
| 145 || September 14 || Rays || 1–8 || Cobb (1–0) || Estrada (8–9) || — || 41,001 || 79–66 || 2
|-  style="text-align:center; background:#bfb;"
| 146 || September 15 || @ Angels || 7–2 || Happ (19–4) || Wright (0–3) || — || 37,559 || 80–66 || 2 
|-  style="text-align:center; background:#bfb;"
| 147 || September 16 || @ Angels || 5–0 || Dickey (10–14) || Weaver (11–12) || Osuna (33) || 42,159 || 81–66 || 2 
|-  style="text-align:center; background:#fbb;"
| 148 || September 17 || @ Angels || 1–6 || Nolasco (6–14) || Liriano (7–13) || — || 39,195 || 81–67 || 3 
|-  style="text-align:center; background:#fbb;"
| 149 || September 18 || @ Angels || 0–4 || Meyer (1–3) || Stroman (9–9) || — || 36,270 || 81–68 || 4
|-  style="text-align:center; background:#bfb;"
| 150 || September 19 || @ Mariners || 3–2 || Estrada (8–9) || Walker (6–11) || Osuna (34) || 34,809 || 82–68 || 4
|-  style="text-align:center; background:#bfb;"
| 151 || September 20 || @ Mariners || 10–2 || Happ (20–4) || Iwakuma (16–12) || — || 33,573 || 83–68 || 4 
|-  style="text-align:center; background:#fbb;"
| 152 || September 21 || @ Mariners || 1–2 (12) || Vincent (4–4) || Dickey (10–15) || — || 39,595 || 83–69 || 5
|-  style="text-align:center; background:#bfb;"
| 153 || September 23 || Yankees || 9–0 || Liriano (8–13) || Mitchell (1–2) || — || 47,016 || 84–69 || 5½
|-  style="text-align:center; background:#bfb;"
| 154 || September 24 || Yankees || 3–0 || Grilli (7–5) || Clippard (3–5) || Osuna (35) || 47,828 || 85–69 || 5½
|-  style="text-align:center; background:#bfb;"
| 155 || September 25 || Yankees || 4–3 || Osuna (3–2) || Clippard (3–6) || — || 47,896 || 86–69 || 5½
|-  style="text-align:center; background:#fbb;"
| 156 || September 26 || Yankees || 5–7 || Warren (7–4) || Grilli (7–6) || Layne (1) || 44,532 || 86–70 || 6
|-  style="text-align:center; background:#bfb;"
| 157 || September 27 || Orioles || 5–1 || Sanchez (14–2) || Gausman (8–12) || — || 44,762  || 87–70 || 5 
|-  style="text-align:center; background:#fbb;"
| 158 || September 28 || Orioles || 2–3 || Duensing (1–0) || Osuna (3–3) || Britton (47) || 44,668 || 87–71 || 5
|-  style="text-align:center; background:#fbb;"
| 159 || September 29 || Orioles || 0–4 || Jiménez (8–12) || Stroman (9–10) || — || 47,791 || 87–72 || 5 
|-  style="text-align:center; background:#fbb;"
| 160 || September 30 || @ Red Sox || 3–5 || Ziegler (4–6) || Biagini (4–3) || Kimbrel (31) || 37,661 || 87–73 || 6
|-

|-  style="text-align:center; background:#bfb;"
| 161 || October 1 || @ Red Sox || 4–3 || Osuna (4–3) || Kimbrel (2–6) || — || 37,396 || 88–73 || 5
|-  style="text-align:center; background:#bfb;"
| 162 || October 2 || @ Red Sox || 2–1 || Sanchez (15–2) || Ziegler (4–7) || Osuna (36) || 36,787 || 89–73 || 4 
|-

Postseason

American League Wild Card Game

On October 4, the Toronto Blue Jays hosted the Baltimore Orioles at the Rogers Centre in the American League Wild Card Game. The starters, Marcus Stroman for the Blue Jays and Chris Tillman for the Orioles, were announced on October 3. In the bottom of the second inning, José Bautista hit a solo home run to give Toronto a 1–0 lead. American League home run leader Mark Trumbo hit a two-run home run in the top of the fourth inning to give Baltimore a 2–1 lead. Ezequiel Carrera singled in a run in the fifth inning to tie the game at 2–2. In the seventh inning, Melvin Upton Jr. pinch-hit for Michael Saunders and flew out to Hyun-soo Kim in left field. A person in the outfield seats, later identified by Toronto police as Kenneth Pagan, threw a beer can in the direction of Kim, landing several feet away and causing the game to be briefly delayed while police searched for the perpetrator. Pagan, a 41-year-old copy editor for Postmedia Network from Hamilton, Ontario, was later charged with mischief after surrendering himself to Toronto police amid the publication of his face from Rogers Centre security footage. With the game still tied, Roberto Osuna came in to pitch the ninth and tenth innings, but left after recording an out in the tenth with minor shoulder tightness. With one out in the bottom of the eleventh, Orioles manager Buck Showalter elected to use Ubaldo Jiménez in relief, still having Cy Young Award candidate Zach Britton available. Jiménez allowed a single to Devon Travis, followed by a single by Josh Donaldson which was misplayed by outfielder Nolan Reimold, allowing Travis to advance to third base. With the winning run 90 feet away, Edwin Encarnación hit a walk-off, three-run home run on the first pitch to give the Blue Jays a 5–2 victory and send them to the American League Division Series.

Encarnación became only the fourth player to end a winner-take-all postseason game with a walk-off home run, joining Bill Mazeroski (1960 World Series), Chris Chambliss (1976 ALCS) and Aaron Boone (2003 ALCS).

American League Division Series

In a rematch of last year's Division Series, the Blue Jays took on the Texas Rangers in the 2016 ALDS. The Blue Jays took an early 5–0 lead in the third inning of the first game, thanks to RBI hits from Josh Donaldson and José Bautista and a three-run triple by Troy Tulowitzki. In the fourth, Toronto added two runs on a solo home run by Melvin Upton Jr. and a Donaldson single to take a 7–0 lead. Bautista hit a three-run home run in the ninth inning to give the Jays a 10–0 lead. Marco Estrada pitched a gem, going 8 innings and allowing just four hits and one run in the bottom of the ninth to take the win, 10–1.

J. A. Happ got the start for the Blue Jays in game two, while Yu Darvish started for the Rangers. Each starter went five innings, with Happ allowing just a single run on nine hits and Darvish allowing five runs on home runs by Troy Tulowitzki, Kevin Pillar, Ezequiel Carrera, and Edwin Encarnación. In the eighth inning, Carlos Gómez hit an RBI single that struck Francisco Liriano near the back of the head. Roberto Osuna came on and closed out the game, 5–3, with a five-out save. The Blue Jays took a 2–0 series lead with the win, heading back to Toronto.

With the series moving to the Rogers Centre, the Blue Jays sought to eliminate the Rangers from the postseason for the second consecutive season. Aaron Sanchez got the start for the Jays, while the Rangers started Colby Lewis. Lewis lasted only two innings, yielding five earned runs on five hits including home runs by Edwin Encarnación and Russell Martin. Sanchez would go 5 innings, but was responsible for six earned runs after Joe Biagini allowed a two-run double by Mitch Moreland. The Blue Jays would tie the game in the bottom of the sixth inning, after a passed ball scored Troy Tulowitzki. With the game tied 6–6 in the tenth inning, Russell Martin hit a ground ball to shortstop Elvis Andrus. Rougned Odor was unable to turn the double play, throwing wide of first base. Moreland bobbled the ball, which allowed Josh Donaldson to score the winning run and sweep Texas out of the playoffs, 7–6.

American League Championship Series

Toronto advanced to the ALCS for the second consecutive year, and took on the Cleveland Indians, who swept the Boston Red Sox in the other half of the ALDS. On October 11, the Blue Jays named Marco Estrada their starter for the first game of the best-of-seven series. The following day, the Indians announced that Corey Kluber would start Game 1. Kluber and the Indians' bullpen would combine to shutout the Blue Jays, winning 2–0. Losing 2–1 in the second game of the series, the Blue Jays bats were silenced once again by reliever Andrew Miller, who struck out another five batters in two innings. Cody Allen closed the game and gave the Indians a 2–0 series lead heading to Toronto.

Trevor Bauer, who had to be scratched from his scheduled Game 2 start due to a finger injury suffered while repairing a toy drone, started for Cleveland in Game 3. The Blue Jays turned to Marcus Stroman, who had not pitched since the Wild Card Game. Bauer was forced to leave in the first inning after the cut on his little finger opened and bled profusely. While Stroman would allow four runs in 5 innings, the Cleveland bullpen would combine to pitch 8 and allow just two runs to take the third game of the series, 4–2, and a commanding 3–0 series lead. The Blue Jays would avoid being swept out of the ALCS, with Aaron Sanchez allowing one run on two hits over six innings pitched in a 5–1 victory. The playoffs would end for Toronto in Game 5, as the Indians advanced to the World Series with a 3–0 win.

Postseason game log

|-  style="text-align:center; background:#bfb;"
| 1 || October 4 || Orioles || 5–2 (11) || Liriano (1–0) || Jiménez (0–1) || — || 49,934 || 1–0
|-

|-  style="text-align:center; background:#bfb;"
| 1 || October 6 || @ Rangers || 10–1 || Estrada (1–0) || Hamels (0–1) || — || 47,434 || 1–0
|-  style="text-align:center; background:#bfb;"
| 2 || October 7 || @ Rangers || 5–3 || Happ (1–0) || Darvish (0–1) || Osuna (1) || 48,019  || 2–0
|-  style="text-align:center; background:#bfb;"
| 3 || October 9 || Rangers || 7–6 (10) || Osuna (1–0) || Bush (0–1) || — || 49,555 || 3–0
|-

|-  style="text-align:center; background:#fbb;"
| 1 || October 14 || @ Indians || 0–2 || Kluber (1–0) || Estrada (0–1) || Allen (1) || 37,727 || 0–1
|-  style="text-align:center; background:#fbb;"
| 2 || October 15 || @ Indians || 1–2 || Tomlin (1–0) || Happ (0–1) || Allen (2) || 37,870 || 0–2 
|-  style="text-align:center; background:#fbb;"
| 3 || October 17 || Indians || 2–4 || Shaw (1–0) || Stroman (0–1) || Miller (1) || 49,507 || 0–3
|-  style="text-align:center; background:#bfb;"
| 4 || October 18 || Indians || 5–1 || Sanchez (1–0) || Kluber (1–1) || — || 49,142 || 1–3 
|-  style="text-align:center; background:#fbb;"
| 5 || October 19 || Indians || 0–3 || Shaw (2–0) || Estrada (0–2) || Allen (3) || 48,800 || 1–4 
|-

Postseason rosters

| style="text-align:left" |
Pitchers: 6 Marcus Stroman 25 Marco Estrada 27 Brett Cecil 31 Joe Biagini 37 Jason Grilli 45 Francisco Liriano 46 Scott Feldman 52 Ryan Tepera 54 Roberto Osuna 62 Aaron Loup
Catchers: 30 Dioner Navarro 55 Russell Martin 
Infielders: 2 Troy Tulowitzki 14 Justin Smoak 17 Ryan Goins 18 Darwin Barney 20 Josh Donaldson 29 Devon Travis
Outfielders: 3 Ezequiel Carrera 7 Melvin Upton Jr. 11 Kevin Pillar 19 José Bautista 21 Michael Saunders 23 Dalton Pompey
Designated hitters: 10 Edwin Encarnación 
|- valign="top"

| style="text-align:left" |
Pitchers: 6 Marcus Stroman 24 Danny Barnes  25 Marco Estrada 27 Brett Cecil 31 Joe Biagini 34 J. A. Happ 37 Jason Grilli 41 Aaron Sanchez 45 Francisco Liriano  46 Scott Feldman 52 Ryan Tepera 54 Roberto Osuna 62 Aaron Loup
Catchers: 30 Dioner Navarro 55 Russell Martin
Infielders: 2 Troy Tulowitzki 14 Justin Smoak 18 Darwin Barney 20 Josh Donaldson 29 Devon Travis
Outfielders: 3 Ezequiel Carrera 7 Melvin Upton Jr. 11 Kevin Pillar 19 José Bautista 21 Michael Saunders
Designated hitters: 10 Edwin Encarnación
|- valign="top"

| style="text-align:left" |
Pitchers: 6 Marcus Stroman 25 Marco Estrada 27 Brett Cecil 31 Joe Biagini 34 J. A. Happ 37 Jason Grilli 41 Aaron Sanchez 45 Francisco Liriano 52 Ryan Tepera 54 Roberto Osuna 62 Aaron Loup
Catchers: 30 Dioner Navarro 55 Russell Martin
Infielders: 2 Troy Tulowitzki 14 Justin Smoak  17 Ryan Goins 18 Darwin Barney 20 Josh Donaldson 29 Devon Travis  
Outfielders: 3 Ezequiel Carrera 7 Melvin Upton Jr. 11 Kevin Pillar 19 José Bautista 21 Michael Saunders 23 Dalton Pompey
Designated hitters: 10 Edwin Encarnación
|- valign="top"

Roster

Statistics

Batting
Note: G = Games played; AB = At bats; R = Runs scored; H = Hits; 2B = Doubles; 3B = Triples; HR = Home runs; RBI = Runs batted in; SB = Stolen bases; BB = Walks; AVG = Batting average; Ref. = Reference

Pitching
Note: G = Games pitched; GS = Games started; W = Wins; L = Losses; SV = Saves; ERA = Earned run average; WHIP = Walks + hits per inning pitched; IP = Innings pitched; H = Hits allowed; R = Total runs allowed; ER = Earned runs allowed; BB = Walks allowed; K = Strikeouts; Ref. = Reference

Awards

Transactions

April
 On April 2, signed Franklin Morales to a one-year, $2 million contract, and optioned Ryan Tepera to Triple-A Buffalo.
 On April 3, placed Marco Estrada, Aaron Loup, Devon Travis, and Bo Schultz on the 15-day disabled list, and acquired Chris Leroux from the Philadelphia Phillies in exchange for cash considerations.
 On April 7, outrighted A. J. Jiménez to Triple-A Buffalo.
 On April 10, activated Marco Estrada off the 15-day disabled list, and placed Franklin Morales on the 15-day disabled list, retroactive to April 7, with left shoulder fatigue.
 On April 13, designated Arnold León for assignment, and recalled Pat Venditte from Triple-A Buffalo.
 On April 15, signed Kyle Westwood to a minor league contract.
 On April 22, placed Chris Colabello on the restricted list, signed Michael Bourn to a minor league contract, and selected the contract of Chad Girodo from the Triple-A Buffalo Bisons.
 On April 23, outrighted Arnold León to Triple-A Buffalo.
 On April 24, optioned Chad Girodo and recalled Drew Hutchison from Triple-A Buffalo.
 On April 26, optioned Drew Hutchison and recalled Matt Dominguez from Triple-A Buffalo.
 On April 27, signed Roberto Hernández to a minor league contract, optioned Pat Venditte, and recalled Ryan Tepera from Triple-A Buffalo.
 On April 28, sent Bo Schultz on a rehab assignment to the Advanced-A Dunedin Blue Jays.

May
 On May 4, optioned Matt Dominguez, recalled Chad Girodo from Triple-A Buffalo, and sent Bo Schultz on a rehab assignment to the Double-A New Hampshire Fisher Cats.
 On May 6, optioned Ryan Tepera, and selected the contract of Andy Burns from Triple-A Buffalo.
 On May 9, placed Brett Cecil on the paternity list and recalled Ryan Tepera from Triple-A Buffalo.
 On May 12, activated Brett Cecil from the paternity list, and optioned Ryan Tepera to Triple-A Buffalo.
 On May 13, sent Devon Travis on a rehab assignment to the Advanced-A Dunedin Blue Jays.
 On May 14, sent Aaron Loup and Bo Schultz on rehab assignments to the Advanced-A Dunedin Blue Jays and Triple-A Buffalo Bisons respectively.
 On May 15, placed Brett Cecil on the 15-day disabled list, and selected the contract of Dustin Antolin from the Triple-A Buffalo Bisons.
 On May 16, claimed Jimmy Paredes off waivers from the Baltimore Orioles.
 On May 17, activated Jimmy Paredes, recalled Pat Venditte, and optioned Andy Burns and Dustin Antolin to Triple-A Buffalo.
 On May 19, sent Devon Travis on a rehab assignment to the Triple-A Buffalo Bisons.
 On May 21, sent Aaron Loup on a rehab assignment to the Triple-A Buffalo Bisons.
 On May 25, activated Devon Travis and optioned Pat Venditte to the Triple-A Buffalo Bisons.
 On May 27, signed Ryan Lavarnway to a minor league contract.
 On May 28, placed Troy Tulowitzki on the 15-day disabled list, and activated Aaron Loup.
 On May 30, designated Jimmy Paredes for assignment, and recalled Ryan Tepera from the Triple-A Buffalo Bisons.
 On May 31, acquired Jason Grilli and cash considerations from the Atlanta Braves for Sean Ratcliffe.

June
 On June 1, activated Jason Grilli, optioned Chad Girodo to Triple-A Buffalo, and traded Jimmy Paredes to the Philadelphia Phillies for cash considerations or a player to be named later.
 On June 3, signed Wilmin Lara to a minor league contract.
 On June 5, optioned Ryan Tepera and recalled Matt Dominguez from Triple-A Buffalo.
 On June 7, designated Matt Dominguez for assignment and recalled Pat Venditte from the Triple-A Buffalo Bisons.
 On June 8, optioned Matt Dominguez to the Triple-A Buffalo Bisons.
 On June 13, transferred Franklin Morales to the 60-day disabled list, optioned Pat Venditte, and selected the contract of Scott Diamond from the Triple-A Buffalo Bisons.
 On June 15, designated Scott Diamond for assignment, optioned Aaron Loup, and recalled Andy Burns and Chad Girodo from Triple-A Buffalo.
 On June 16, sent Troy Tulowitzki on a rehab assignment to the Advanced-A Dunedin Blue Jays.
 On June 17, placed José Bautista on the 15-day disabled list with a left foot injury, and recalled Darrell Ceciliani from Triple-A Buffalo.
 On June 18, activated Troy Tulowitzki and optioned Andy Burns to Triple-A Buffalo.
 On June 21, sent Brett Cecil and Franklin Morales on a rehab assignment to the Advanced-A Dunedin Blue Jays.
 On June 22, traded Wade LeBlanc to the Seattle Mariners for cash considerations or a player to be named later.
 On June 24, optioned Darrell Ceciliani, and selected the contact of Junior Lake from the Triple-A Buffalo Bisons.
 On June 25, sent Brett Cecil on a rehab assignment to the Triple-A Buffalo Bisons.
 On June 26, placed Gavin Floyd on the 15-day disabled list with right shoulder tightness, recalled Bo Schultz, and sent Franklin Morales on a rehab assignment to the Triple-A Buffalo Bisons.
 On June 27, optioned Chad Girodo and recalled Ryan Tepera from the Triple-A Buffalo Bisons.
 On June 30, activated Brett Cecil and optioned Ryan Tepera to the Triple-A Buffalo Bisons.

July
 On July 2, placed Ryan Goins on the 15-day disabled list with right forearm tightness, optioned Bo Schultz, and recalled Drew Hutchison and Aaron Loup from Triple-A Buffalo.
 On July 6, placed Marco Estrada on the 15-day disabled list with a back injury, and recalled Bo Schultz from Triple-A Buffalo.
 On July 7, signed Wilmer Font to a minor league contract.
 On July 8, optioned Drew Hutchinson and recalled Andy Burns from Triple-A Buffalo.
 On July 15, sent Ryan Goins on a rehab assignment to the Triple-A Buffalo Bisons.
 On July 20, sent José Bautista on a rehab assignment to the Advanced-A Dunedin Blue Jays.
 On July 22, activated Marco Estrada and Franklin Morales, optioned Aaron Loup and Andy Burns, designated Dustin Antolin for assignment, and sent José Bautista on a rehab assignment to the Triple-A Buffalo Bisons.
 On July 23, designated Chris Colabello for assignment, and outrighted Dustin Antolin to Triple-A Buffalo.
 On July 24, designated Drew Storen for assignment, and recalled Ryan Tepera from Triple-A Buffalo.
 On July 25, activated Jose Bautista, and designated Junior Lake for assignment.
 On July 26, traded Hansel Rodriguez to the San Diego Padres for Melvin Upton, Jr. and cash considerations, and traded Drew Storen and cash considerations to the Seattle Mariners for Joaquín Benoit.
 On July 27, activated Joaquín Benoit, and optioned Bo Schultz to Triple-A Buffalo.
 On July 28, signed Erik Kratz to a minor league contract.
 On July 31, outrighted Junior Lake to Triple-A Buffalo.

August
 On August 1, designated Franklin Morales and Ben Rowen for assignment, placed Ezequiel Carrera on the 15-day disabled list with a left Achilles tendon strain, recalled Bo Schultz from Triple-A Buffalo, activated Ryan Goins, acquired Mike Bolsinger from the Los Angeles Dodgers for Jesse Chavez and cash considerations, Scott Feldman from the Houston Astros for Guadalupe Chavez, and Francisco Liriano, Reese McGuire, and Harold Ramírez from the Pittsburgh Pirates for Drew Hutchison, and optioned Bolsinger to Triple-A Buffalo and Ramírez to Double-A New Hampshire.
 On August 2, optioned Ryan Goins and Bo Schultz, recalled Mike Bolsinger, and selected the contract of Danny Barnes from the Triple-A Buffalo Bisons.
 On August 3, activated Francisco Liriano and optioned Mike Bolsinger to Triple-A Buffalo.
 On August 6, traded Pat Venditte to the Seattle Mariners for a player to be named later.
 On August 8, placed Kevin Pillar on the 15-day disabled list with a left thumb sprain, and recalled Darrell Ceciliani from Triple-A Buffalo.
 On August 9, released Franklin Morales.
 On August 10, optioned Danny Barnes, placed José Bautista on the 15-day disabled list with a left knee sprain, recalled Ryan Tepera, and selected the contract of Junior Lake from the Triple-A Buffalo Bisons.
 On August 12, sent Ezequiel Carrera on a rehab assignment to the Triple-A Buffalo Bisons.
 On August 16, signed John Straka to a minor league contract, activated Ezequiel Carrera, and designated Junior Lake for assignment.
 On August 18, signed Ty Sterner to a minor league contract.
 On August 19, acquired Richard Reina from the New York Mets for cash considerations, signed Gregor Mora to a minor league contract, recalled Ryan Goins, optioned Darrell Ceciliani, and outrighted Junior Lake to Triple-A Buffalo.
 On August 20, sent Kevin Pillar on a rehab assignment to the Advanced-A Dunedin Blue Jays.
 On August 21, optioned Aaron Sanchez to the Advanced-A Dunedin Blue Jays, and recalled Aaron Loup.
 On August 23, activated Kevin Pillar and optioned Ryan Tepera to Triple-A Buffalo.
 On August 25, activated José Bautista, optioned Ryan Goins, and signed Eric Veglahn to a minor league contract.
 On August 26, acquired Dioner Navarro from the Chicago White Sox for Colton Turner.
 On August 27, designated Aaron Loup for assignment, and recalled Bo Schultz from Triple-A Buffalo.
 On August 29, activated Dioner Navarro and designated Josh Thole for assignment.
 On August 31, recalled Aaron Sanchez and Ryan Goins, signed Josh Thole, placed Darwin Barney on the family medical emergency list, and optioned Bo Schultz to Triple-A Buffalo.

September
 On September 1, optioned Devon Travis to the Rookie-Advanced Bluefield Blue Jays.
 On September 2, designated Matt Dominguez for assignment, selected the contract of Matt Dermody, and recalled Danny Barnes, Darrell Ceciliani, Dalton Pompey, Ryan Tepera, and Devon Travis.
 On September 3, activated Darwin Barney, and outrighted Matt Dominguez to Triple-A Buffalo.
 On September 6, recalled Aaron Loup and Bo Schultz.
 On September 27, designated Brady Dragmire for assignment, recalled Andy Burns, and selected the contract of Chris Smith from the Triple-A Buffalo Bisons.

October
 On October 5, traded Brady Dragmire to the Pittsburgh Pirates for cash considerations.

Farm system

Notes

References

External links
2016 Toronto Blue Jays at Baseball Reference

Toronto Blue Jays seasons
Toronto Blue Jays
Toronto Blue Jays
Toronto Blue Jays